Irmgard Oepen (February 25, 1929 – July 9, 2018) was a German physician and medical journalist. She was known for her steadfast criticism of alternative medicine, especially of homeopathy.

Education and Career
Irmgard Oepen studied medicine at the University of Freiburg and the Ludwig Maximilian University of Munich (LMU), earning her doctorate at LMU in 1958. In 1973 she got her habilitation at the Philipps University of Marburg with a study of blood group serology.

Oepen worked from 1965 to 1994 at the Institute for Legal Medicine of  Philipps-University Marburg. She was known for her commitment to scientific medicine. She published numerous articles critical of homeopathy and other alternative medical practices such as astrological health counseling.

Her work has been mentioned in Die Zeit.  She published several works with Forensic serologist Otto Prokop.

Oepen was one of the founding members of the Gesellschaft zur wissenschaftlichen Untersuchung von Parawissenschaften (GWUP), a German group that investigates dubious scientific claims, especially in the fields of health and medicine.  From 1987 to 1994 she was President of  GWUP.  In the years 1987 to 1996 she led the editorial board of the GWUP published magazine Skeptiker.  She was also a member of the transnational American organization The Committee for Skeptical Inquiry.

Works
 Leitfaden der gerichtlich-medizinischen Blutspuren-Untersuchung, mit Franz Schleyer, Schmidt-Römhild Verlag, 1977
 An den Grenzen der Schulmedizin, Deutscher Ärzteverlag, 1985
 Außenseitermethoden in der Medizin, mit O. Prokop (Herausgeber), Wissenschaftliche Buchgesellschaft, Darmstadt 1987, 
 Unkonventionelle medizinische Verfahren, S. Fischer Verlag, 1993, 
 Lexikon der Parawissenschaften, GWUP, Lit, Münster 1999
 Irmgard Oepen, Horst Löb: Der Orgon-Strahler – eine funktionslose, aber offenbar gewinnbringende Attrappe. Skeptiker 11 (4/1998) 148–152
 Irmgard Oepen: Unkonventionelle medizinische Verfahren. Stuttgart 1993
 Irmgard Oepen, Amardeo Sarma (Hrsg.): Paramedizin - Analysen und Kommentare. Münster 1998
 Irmgard Oepen, Rolf Scheidt: Wunderheiler heute. Eine kritische Literaturstudie. München, Zuckschwerdt 1989

References

Sources
 Harder, Bernd (2018). In Memoriam: Prof. Irmgard Oepen, Gründungspräsidentin der GWUP, July 11, 2018
 Skeptiker magazine (2007). GWUP interview with Irmgard Oepen 3-4/2007
 Hövelmann, Gerd H. & Michels, Hans (2017). Legitimacy of Unbelief: The Collected Papers of Piet Hein Hoebens edited by Gerd H. Hövelmann, Hans Michels, Publisher: LIT Verlag, April 2017, 
 Zeit Online (1993). Der Glaubenskrieg um die Homöopathie eskaliert: Der Bannstrahl des Äskulap (English:  The religious war over homeopathy escalates), March 5, 1993

1929 births
2018 deaths
20th-century German physicians
21st-century German physicians
Academic staff of the University of Marburg
German medical writers
German skeptics